Mohamed Zaouche (born January 21, 1983 in Chlef) is an Algerian football player. He currently plays for ASO Chlef in the Algerian Ligue Professionnelle 1.

Honours
 Won the Algerian Cup once with ASO Chlef in 2005
 Won the Algerian Ligue Professionnelle 1 once with ASO Chlef in 2011

External links
 DZFoot Profile
 

1983 births
Living people
People from Chlef
Algerian footballers
Algerian Ligue Professionnelle 1 players
ASO Chlef players
Association football midfielders
21st-century Algerian people